Vietnam participated in the 2009 Asian Indoor Games held in Hanoi, Vietnam from October 28 to November 8 with 407 athletes competing in all sport events and one demonstrative event.

Medalists

References

 Official site

Nations at the 2009 Asian Indoor Games
Asian Indoor Games
Vietnam at the Asian Indoor Games